Qazyan (also, Kaz’yan) is a village and municipality in the Tartar Rayon of Azerbaijan.  It has a population of 784.

References 

Populated places in Tartar District